Olav Førli (20 July 1920 – 14 March 2011) was a Norwegian football goalkeeper. He joined Larvik Turn from Urædd in 1946, and became a mainstay for the Larvik club. He was capped twice for Norway.

References

1920 births
2011 deaths
Sportspeople from Porsgrunn
Norwegian footballers
Larvik Turn players
Norway international footballers
Association football goalkeepers